Moca chlorolepis is a moth in the family Immidae. It was described by Walsingham in 1900. It is found on Christmas Island.

References

Moths described in 1900
Immidae
Moths of Australia